Party of Five is an American television teen and family drama created by Christopher Keyser and Amy Lippman that originally aired on Fox for six seasons from September 12, 1994, to May 3, 2000. The series featured an ensemble cast led by Scott Wolf as Bailey, Matthew Fox as Charlie, Neve Campbell as Julia, and Lacey Chabert as Claudia Salinger, who with their baby brother Owen (played by several actors) constitute five siblings whom the series follows after the loss of their parents in a car accident. Notable co-stars included Scott Grimes, Paula Devicq, Michael Goorjian, Jeremy London, and Jennifer Love Hewitt. While categorized as a series aimed at teenagers and young adults, Party of Five explored several mature themes, including substance and domestic abuse, teen pregnancy, mental illness, cancer, and the long-term effects of parental loss.

Despite receiving positive reviews from television critics after its debut, including TV Guide naming it "The Best Show You're Not Watching" in 1995, the series suffered from low ratings during its first and second seasons, during which speculation arose that it would soon be cancelled. In 1996, Party of Five won the Golden Globe Award for Best Television Series – Drama, after which ratings and popularity grew for the majority of the remainder of the series. A spin-off starring Hewitt debuted on the network in 1999, Time of Your Life, which was cancelled after one season.

Synopsis 
The show, set in San Francisco, centered on the five Salinger siblings (the "party of five" of the show's title), who become orphans after their parents are killed in a car accident caused by a drunk driver. The family is composed of 24-year-old Charlie (Matthew Fox), the eldest, a womanizing, immature manual laborer who struggles with the responsibility of being the new head of the family; 16-year-old Bailey (Scott Wolf), the once-rebellious teen forced into a role of responsible caretaker and later veering into alcoholism; 15-year-old Julia (Neve Campbell), a sensitive teen; 11-year-old Claudia (Lacey Chabert), a precocious child prodigy musician; and baby Owen, age one.

The siblings take over the running of their family's restaurant, Salinger's. Charlie initially serves as bartender and manager, and later Bailey takes over. Over the years, the Salingers face various struggles: the long-term effects of parental loss; in season 3, Bailey's attempt to recover from alcoholism; in season 4, Charlie's diagnosis with cancer; and in season 5, Julia's dealing with domestic violence in a relationship.

As the series progressed, romantic relationships became plot points and new cast members joined the show, including Jennifer Love Hewitt as Sarah, Bailey's girlfriend; Jeremy London as Griffin, Julia's "bad-boy" boyfriend and later husband; and Paula Devicq as Kirsten, Owen's nanny, who develops an on-again-off-again relationship with Charlie throughout the series, until they get married during the show's sixth and final season.

Cast and characters

Main 

 Scott Wolf as Bailey Salinger (ages 16–21); the second-born sibling who is forced to grow up fast after growing up as a rebellious teenager and deal with life after his parents' deaths.
 Matthew Fox as Charlie Salinger (ages 24–30); the eldest sibling who struggles to live his own life in the reluctant role of legal guardian to his brothers and sisters. Immature and insecure, he dropped out of college his senior year to "find himself" and was planning to re-enroll when his parents' deaths made him his siblings' legal guardian. 
 Neve Campbell as Julia Salinger (ages 15–20); a highly intelligent, emotionally sensitive teen who struggles to adjust to being an orphan and having more family responsibilities.
 Lacey Chabert as Claudia Salinger (ages 11–17); a gifted violinist struggling to build a life for herself and also deal with being an orphan.
 Paula Devicq as Kirsten Bennett Salinger (seasons 1–2, 5–6, recurring seasons 2–4); a graduate student who is hired as Owen Salinger's nanny and becomes romantically involved with Charlie off-and-on during the series, eventually marrying by season six and being pregnant with their first child by the end of series.
 Scott Grimes as Will McCorkle (seasons 1–2, 6, recurring seasons 3–5); Bailey's best friend from high school.
Michael Goorjian as Justin Thompson (season 2, recurring seasons 1, 3–6); Julia's friend, and later off-and-on boyfriend, during the series.
 Jennifer Love Hewitt as Sarah Reeves Merrin (seasons 2–6); Bailey's sensitive, off-and-on girlfriend from high school who struggles to "find herself" after she finds out that she was adopted.
 Alexondra Lee as Callie Martel (season 3); Bailey's roommate and girlfriend during his freshman year at college.
 Jeremy London as Griffin Chase Holbrook (seasons 4–6, recurring seasons 2–3); A moody and troubled teenager whom Julia dates, and later marries and divorces. Older brother of Jill Holbrook. The character was originally portrayed by James Marsden in the first-season finale episode.
 Jennifer Aspen as Daphne Jablonsky (season 6, recurring seasons 4–5); a part-time stripper who becomes briefly romantically involved with Charlie and later has his baby.

Recurring 
The following lists all actors who appeared in five or more episodes during the run of the show.

Production 
Fox Entertainment Group chairman Sandy Grushow commissioned the show as a possible replacement for Beverly Hills, 90210, which was then in its fourth season. Grushow stated that "I wanted a show that would possess many of the same values that '90210' had in the beginning. A show about teenagers and for teenagers. I pitched the notion of a group of kids who lost their parents in a tragic accident and therefore were forced to raise themselves."

When Christopher Keyser and Amy Lippman came on board to create the show, they disliked the more lighthearted premise the network had come up with, essentially of a bunch of teens without parents left to go wild, which Keyser called a "Don't Tell Mom the Babysitter's Dead kind of thing." They decided to take the show in a more dramatic direction, where the characters have to deal with the serious repercussions of being orphaned and growing up.

Jerry O'Connell was initially offered the role of Bailey, but he chose to sign with the series Sliders instead. Scott Wolf auditioned and was cast the very same day, the first of the actors to be cast.
Neve Campbell, who was still living in Canada at the time, auditioned for Party of Five while she was in Los Angeles interviewing with different talent agencies to represent her. She auditioned along with her then-roommate Tara Strong, and ended up winning the role of Julia and moving to LA for the show, after it was picked up by Fox for a full series.

The show was produced by Columbia Pictures Television (CPT) and High Productions. CPT would later be folded into Columbia TriStar Domestic Television, which soon afterward became Sony Pictures Television.

Nielsen ratings

Episodes

Home media 
On April 27, 1999, Columbia TriStar Home Video released the season 2 episode "The Wedding", the season 3 episode "Intervention", and the season 4 episode "Richer, Poorer, Sickness, and Health" on VHS.

Sony Pictures Home Entertainment released all six seasons of Party of Five on DVD in Region 1 between 2004 and 2013.

In August 2013, it was announced that Mill Creek Entertainment had acquired the rights to various television series from the Sony Pictures library including Party of Five. They subsequently re-released season 1 on DVD on June 24, 2014, followed by season 2 on January 6, 2015. On January 5, 2016, Mill Creek released a complete series set featuring all six seasons of the series, available together for the first time.

In January 2016, it was announced that Hulu had acquired the rights to every episode of the series.

♦ - Manufacture-on-Demand (MOD) release.

Critical reception 
For the show's first season, review aggregator website Rotten Tomatoes reported an approval rating of 85% based on 13 critic reviews, with an average rating of 6.4/10. The website's critics consensus reads, "A sincere family drama full of tear-jerking moments, Party of Five excels at its authentic depiction of young adult issues."

Awards and nominations

Reboot

In January 2018, Freeform ordered a pilot for a reboot of Party of Five, featuring five children who must take care of themselves after their parents are deported back to Mexico. In April 2020, the reboot was canceled after one season.

In popular culture
Party of Five is credited with "[moving] televised stories about and targeted at young adults away from the soap-opera genre and [helping to] make the medium safer for the more realistic teenagers we’d meet later on Dawson’s Creek, Freaks and Geeks, Friday Night Lights, and Gilmore Girls."

In 2021, Party of Five was one of the shows featured in the third episode of season 1 of Vice Media's Dark Side of the 90s entitled "TV for Teens."

References

Further reading 
 John J. O'Connor. "Trying to Make a House a Home". The New York Times. October 17, 1994. p. C16.
 Brenda Scott Royce. Party of Five: The Unofficial Companion. Los Angeles: Renaissance Books, 1998. . .

External links 

 
The Original Party of Five Was a Surprisingly Important Series in Esquire
Clip from pilot episode 
Sony Pictures Museum

1990s American teen drama television series
1994 American television series debuts
2000 American television series endings
2000s American teen drama television series
Best Drama Series Golden Globe winners
English-language television shows
Fox Broadcasting Company original programming
Serial drama television series
Fictional quintets
Television series about children
Television series about families
Television series about orphans
Television series about teenagers
Television series by Sony Pictures Television
Television shows set in San Francisco
Television series about siblings
Coming-of-age television shows